Gideon Sprague Ives (January 19, 1846December 20, 1927) was an American politician who served as Mayor of St. Peter, Minnesota, Minnesota State Senator and as the 11th Lieutenant Governor of Minnesota.

Life and career

Ives was born in Dickinson, New York in 1846. His parents Warren and Elizabeth Ives (née Ladd) were descendants of early American settlers with roots going as far back as the 1630s. Ives later moved to Potsdam, New York and, in 1864, enlisted in the 50th New York Volunteer Infantry Regiment taking part in the American Civil War. He was later transferred to the 15th New York Volunteer Infantry Regiment (with whom he served for the majority of the war) and was discharged from service in June 1865.

After the war Ives returned to Potsdam to continue his schooling. He later attended the University of Michigan Law School and, after graduating in 1871, relocated to St. Peter, Minnesota. He served in several local offices there including city attorney, mayor and Nicollet County attorney. In 1878 he married Mary Elizabeth Swift, daughter of Governor Henry A. Swift. He later won election to state office as a Republican, first to the Minnesota Senate in 1886 then as Lieutenant Governor under Governor William Rush Merriam in 1890. Ives was a candidate for the Republican nomination for governor in 1892 but was defeated by Knute Nelson.

While he did not hold another elected office, Ives remained active in state politics and later moved to St. Paul, Minnesota in 1902 to continue his law practice. Later in life he became an important figure to the Minnesota Historical Society, leading efforts to build a home for the organization's collections and library (now the Minnesota Judicial Center) and serving as its president from 1918-1921.

Ives died on December 20, 1927. He is buried in Oakland Cemetery in St. Paul, Minnesota.

Publications
Ives, Gideon S. 1919. "William Gates Le Duc". Minnesota History Bulletin. 3.

References

 In Memorian, Gideon S. Ives
University of Michigan. Michigan Alumnus. [Ann Arbor]: Alumni Association of the University of Michigan, 1894, page 506. Also available from Google Books.

Lieutenant Governors of Minnesota
1846 births
1927 deaths
People from Franklin County, New York
People of New York (state) in the American Civil War
Union Army soldiers
Republican Party Minnesota state senators
University of Michigan Law School alumni
People from St. Peter, Minnesota